Sirsukh is an ancient city that forms part of the ruins at Taxila, near the modern day city of Taxila, Punjab, Pakistan.

City
The city of Sirsukh is said to have been founded during the Kushan era after 80 CE, and is the last of the great ancient cities of Taxila. The invaders decided to abandon the older city of Sirkap and build a newer city on the other side of the Lundi-nala. The wall of the city is about 5 kilometers long and about 5.4 meters thick. The city wall covers an area of around 2300 x 1000 meters seen along the east-west direction, and is laid out in a typical Central Asian style, complete with suburbs. Sirsukh was left uninhabited when the White Huns invaded the Punjab at the end of the fifth century CE. To the north-east of the city flows the Harro river whereas to the south the Lundi-ravine is present.

The ancient city was excavated only on a very small scale in 1915-16 CE, and further excavation work has been impeded by a high water table which threatens the integrity of ancient structures. It was included in the World Heritage List of the UNO in 1980 as part of Taxila.

Wall

The wall of the city is made of large stone bricks with smaller stone bricks in-between the larger ones. It is remarkably smooth on the outer side. Circular bastions are present in the wall at small distances for defence. These bastions contain holes for archers who could shoot arrows at the enemy outside.

See also
 Bhir Mound
 Dharmarajika
 Jaulian
 Mohra Muradu
 Sirkap
 Taxila
 Taxila under the Achaemenids
 Taxila Tehsil
 Ancient institutions of learning in Pakistan

References

Archaeological sites in Pakistan
History of Pakistan
Former populated places in Pakistan
Taxila Tehsil
Archaeological sites in Khyber Pakhtunkhwa